Khosi Ngema  is a South African actress and model known for her character on Netflix's 3 seasons renewed drama series Blood & Water (South African TV series)  as Fikile Mbele opposite Ama Qamata who plays Puleng Khumalo on the series

Born :Khosi Ngema

Citezenship:South Africa

Occupation:Actor

Known for:Blood & Water (South African TV series)

Life and career 
Ngema made her breakthrough in the film industry in 2020, when she got the role of Fikile Bhele in the series “ Blood and Water’’. The show created her a sisterhood between her and her costar Ama Qamata.

In 2021, she went into business as she launched her jewelry collection in partnership with “Grace The Brand.". Ngema appeared on The Wayne Ayers Podcast in 2021.

Gabrielle Union mentioned her on social media.

Filmography

Television

References

External links 
 

Year of birth missing (living people)
Living people
South African television actresses
21st-century South African actresses